Space Engineers is a voxel-based sandbox game, developed and published by Czech independent developer Keen Software House. In 2013, the initial developmental release of the game joined the Steam early access program. During the following years of active development, Space Engineers sold over one million units. In total as of 2019 the game has sold over 3.5 million copies
In May 2015, for approximately a year and a half, the game's source code was officially available and maintained by KSH to assist the modding community.
On December 15, 2016, the game entered Beta and was later officially released on February 28, 2019.

Gameplay

Gameplay of Space Engineers begins with the player selecting or joining a world with specific settings, such as the number of asteroids (an "empty world" can also be picked) and the available starting equipment. When creating or editing a world, several advanced options are available to change how the player will interact with the world, and how the worlds will appear. This includes changing the speed with which several tools and machines will work, the size of the player's inventory, and whether procedural generation will be used (effectively making the world infinite). Upon confirming the world settings, a loading screen appears while the world is generated. This screen consists of a random in-game screenshot as a backdrop, the game's logo, an animated loading icon, and a randomly selected message at the center. The message may be either a helpful gameplay hint, or one of many quotations concerning space, science, and/or engineering. Many of these quotes are from notable scientists such as Isaac Newton, Galileo Galilei, Albert Einstein, as well as authors such as Arthur C. Clarke.

Once in-game, the player is given control of a single astronaut (referred to as a "Space Engineer") and a set of tools comprising a drill, a welder, and a grinder (if spawn with tools is on). Construction begins by choosing any block from the Engineer's inventory, and placing it anywhere in open space to create a new voxel grid. Additional blocks can then be added to this grid to create a structure.

Each block takes up a different amount of space, and can serve a structural, functional, interactive, and/or 
aesthetic purpose. Armor blocks, the most basic and common of all blocks, can be realistically damaged and deformed through collisions or the use of weapons. Some blocks have attached keypads, which can be used to view and manipulate the status of other specific blocks attached to the structure. To be functionally connected however, and to transport materials, blocks called "conveyors" must be used to connect the desired machines. "Functional" blocks require power, which can be provided by solar panels or nuclear reactors attached to the same structure. While reactors must be supplied with uranium, and produce large amounts of power while active, solar panels will continually produce a low output of power when there is line-of-sight to the sun. Once being produced, power is automatically distributed throughout the entire structure and can also be stored in batteries.

Three types of structures are available: small ships, large ships, and stations. The player can toggle between placing small and large block sizes; placing a small variant of a block will create a small ship, while placing a large variant will create a large ship. If a large block is placed in such a way that it intersects terrain voxels (such as an asteroid or planetary surface), a station is created instead. Stations use the same blocks as large ships, and can be converted into large ships by disconnecting them from the terrain (though a world setting can be changed to permit unanchored stations). "Small" and "large" structures can be connected together using connectors creating sub-grids.

The size, resource requirements, and availability of blocks depends on the type of structure they are attached to. Blocks such as assemblers or refineries do not have "small" variants, whereas large ships and stations cannot use gatling guns, instead using AI-controlled gatling or missile turrets. Blocks attached to a small ship are considerably smaller, allowing a much greater level of detail, and require fewer resources than those attached to large ships or stations (for example, light armor requires 25 steel plates on a station, but only one on a small ship).

Ships can be deliberately moved and rotated by external forces and a player as long as they are powered and have at least one gyroscope, thruster, and cockpit. To be able to move in any direction and then be able to stop effectively via inertia dampeners, thrusters must be placed on the structure facing up, down, forward, backward, left, and right. More gyroscopes on a ship will increase the ship's ability to rotate in space, but in order for the inertial dampeners to be more effective, more thrusters must be added in each direction in which dampening is required.

Astronauts floating in space are able to move forward, backward, upwards, downwards, left, or right without restriction by using a jetpack. They are also able to rotate clockwise or counterclockwise. Astronauts and structures can also enable or disable inertial dampeners, which automatically attempt to reduce speed to zero when force is not being applied, and the required thrusters are installed.

If the player disables their jetpack within a gravitational field (either on the surface of a planet or a structure/asteroid with a gravity generator), movement is restricted to a plane perpendicular to the direction of the net gravity field(s). Vertical viewing angle is also restricted between −90 and 90 degrees, as in most first-person shooters. Ships and structures are unaffected by gravity generators unless equipped with at least one Artificial Mass block. If the player falls off a structure while within a gravity field, they will fall into space until out of range of the gravity generator, at which point the player's jetpack will automatically enable itself. However, if the player touches their feet to an asteroid or structure with no gravity present, their "mag-boots" will enable them to walk across its surface and even around edges; though jumping will disconnect the player from the surface, and they cannot traverse the 90-degree angle between a floor and wall.

Several types of cargo ships can spawn randomly and fly through the world, which can be hijacked by the player or harvested for components. Some of these cargo ships are booby trapped to explode when the player attempts to commandeer them, and are sometimes armed with hostile gatling or missile turrets.

All place-able objects can be colored prior to placement using a slider-based GUI. The player can manipulate the hue, saturation, and value of the color to produce a very large spectrum of colors. There are 14 slots where new colors can be saved for later use within the same world. Colors can also be changed after blocks have been placed by clicking the middle mouse button while hovering over a block on the "Color Picker" GUI.

Asteroids and planets consist of terrain voxels, which substantially differ from blocks, and although possible to destroy by the player, cannot be created by them unless in creative mode. Celestial objects are currently fixed in space and cannot move, however, rocks/minerals that have been mined are subject to gravity and will react accordingly. Asteroids also do not currently have gravity associated with them, and can come in several basic forms including spherical, torus, and rod-shapes, as well other variations or combinations of these.

Creative mode
In creative mode, players are able to spawn unlimited resources, can instantly build tools and blocks, and are invincible. Some building tools, such as symmetry mode and copying and pasting of ships, are only available in this mode. Players are also able to build and manipulate asteroids or planets using a space tool known as "Voxel Hands." Although resources are available for collection and refinement, they are not required to create new ships or stations. Creative mode was initially the only mode available in the game. This mode eliminates the survival aspect of the game, allowing players to implement ideas quicker and easier.

Survival mode
In survival mode, players need to mine, collect, and refine various chemical elements from asteroids and planets in order to craft tools, weapons, and blocks as well as produce electricity. Resources can be mined manually using a hand drill, or by using ships with the necessary equipment. Components are produced by assembling them from raw materials; however, they can also be harvested by salvaging cargo ships. To avoid death, players must monitor their health, energy and oxygen levels. Damage can be inflicted on the player by collisions, weapons, contact with thrusters, meteor showers, or by running out of space suit energy. Collisions at higher speeds result in more damage. As the acceleration value of gravity generators stacks, damage from falling can be much more dangerous when multiple gravity generators are active. A player's health and energy can be restored using a Medical Room block, or a Survival Kit block. Energy can also be replenished by sitting in the cockpit of any powered structure. The development of survival mode began at the end of summer of 2013.

Materials and items
In the survival mode of the game, all actions, including survival itself due to the power requirements of the space-suit's life-support system, depend on the gathering and refining of certain minerals. These minerals can be found on asteroids or planets, plundered from randomly spawned ships, or recovered from unknown signals. Raw materials are mined from deposits of ore on asteroids, and are then placed (or sent using a conveyor system) into a basic refinery or refinery in order to refine them to be used in assemblers. The refined materials are formed into various components in the assembler which can then be used in the construction of ships or stations.

Inventories and storage
Inventories in Space Engineers are very flexible and work in a whole-ship manner rather than in an individual one. All inventories connected to a ship can be viewed from any access panel on the same ship, however inventories must be connected via conveyors and conveyor tubes in order for items to be transferred among them. Inventories of refineries and assemblers will automatically request items to refine from connected inventories when they get low, and will send items into an available inventory when it fills up. The conveyor sorter allows inventories to be automatically removed and sorted from and into certain inventories. Instead of a common slot system, Space Engineers uses a volumetric system, measured in litres, with every item having a certain amount of volume and every inventory a certain capacity that it cannot exceed.

Planets
Planets in Space Engineers were released on November 12, 2015, after being in development since February 2015. There are several types of planets, themed after Earth, the Moon, Mars, Titan, Europa, and an "alien" planet. All of these feature multiple space stations that can be traded with for entire grids and materials or gases. The alien planets feature Sabiroids, hostile 6-legged, spider-like NPCs, and the Earth-like planet features wolves, hostile dog-like NPCs.

Planets are somewhat resource-rich, though extraction of useful products from the surface can be difficult. Resources are spread out, and due to planetary gravity and the inefficiency of ion engines within the atmosphere, the player must build ground-based alternatives.

Atmospheric flight is possible even on worlds with oxygen-deprived atmospheres. In order to leave a planet, the player will need to use hydrogen engines with sufficient fuel or build a hybrid spacecraft with atmospheric engines (for liftoff) and ion engines (upper atmosphere to space).

Hybrid surface-to-orbit craft are considerably heavier than their space-only counterparts, but can be built compact enough to fit inside a standard hangar.

Unknown signals
On August 17, 2017, "unknown signals" were added to survival mode. These signals spawn randomly within a certain range of the player, and indicate the position of a small probe via a GPS coordinate and a repeating tone. Each probe contains components and can be disassembled, preventing the player from encountering dead end situations in which they do not have the components needed to produce the basic machines which are essential for constructing components and other machines, effectively preventing a catch-22.

Each probe also possesses a button, which when pressed has a chance to reward the player with a collectible skin, similar to a loot box. The skin can be for the player character's helmet, suit, boots, or tools, and can be traded or sold on the Steam Market. Each skin can be obtained for free in-game, with the exception of three sets: the Veteran Set, which was awarded to players who had owned the game before and played between August and September 2017; the Medieval Set, which is awarded to players who also own Medieval Engineers; and the Golden Set, which is awarded to players who purchase the Space Engineers Deluxe Edition.

Development

Space Engineers was developed and published by the indie video game developer Keen Software House based in the Czech Republic. Implemented as a voxel-based sandbox game set in an asteroid field in space, built on their own game engine, VRAGE 2. Its core feature is volumetricity of the environment. Volumetric objects are structures composed from block-like modules interlocked in a grid and match the scale of the player character. Volumetric objects behave like real physical objects with mass, inertia and velocity. Individual modules have real volume and storage capacity and can be assembled, disassembled, deformed, and repaired or destroyed.

Pre-release
The pre-release alpha build was released on October 23, 2013 on Steam, featuring a single-player "creative" mode. On February 24, 2014, the company announced that Space Engineers had sold over 250,000 copies in four months. On March 24, 2014, Keen Software House announced that two key milestones in the development of Space Engineers have been achieved: survival mode and multiplayer. Content updates and bug fixes for the game are released weekly. On October 20, 2014, Keen Software House announced that the game had sold over 1,000,000 copies. On January 13, 2015, the studio announced their second engineering game, Medieval Engineers, a sandbox game about engineering, construction and the maintenance of architectural works and mechanical equipment using medieval technology.

On May 14, 2015, the source code was made freely available on GitHub to the public to allow easier modding. In February 2016 more parts of the game's source code were released.  Updates to the public code repository were discontinued at the end of 2016.

Full-release

Space Engineers officially released out of early access on February 28, 2019 alongside The Survival Overhaul Update.

Post-release updates and DLCs
Following the release, Keen has continued to release various updates to the game. In most, if not all cases, Keen has divided each update into a mechanical and an aesthetic component; the mechanical component being released for free while the aesthetic component (new block models, texture overlays, engineer suits, and emotes) have been released as a purchasable DLC. This may be a compromise between the need for a semi-predictable revenue stream for continued support of the game, and the need to avoid creating a "pay-to-win" situation.

Reception

Space Engineers won the "4th best Indie Game of 2013" award from IndieDB, an honorable mention in the "Indie of the Year 2014" and first place in "Indie of the Year 2015".

References
  Text was copied from Complete Change Log at Space Engineers  Wiki, which is released under a Creative Commons Attribution-Share Alike 3.0 (Unported) (CC-BY-SA 3.0) license.

External links
 
 Source code - no longer maintained
 Space Engineers Wiki

2019 video games
Indie video games
Multiplayer and single-player video games
Open-world video games
Video games with Steam Workshop support
Video games developed in the Czech Republic
Video games with voxel graphics
Windows games
Commercial video games with freely available source code
Video games using procedural generation
Fiction about asteroid mining
Early access video games
Video games using Havok
Video games with 6 degrees of freedom
Xbox One games
Space flight simulator games
Space simulators